Kashmir Colony كشمير كالونى is a town of Gujranwala district in Punjab Province, Pakistan situated in Gujranwala Cantonment area. It was a small village in the 1970s but now it is developed with all facilities. The development of Kashmir colony took a step further with the building of government high school for boys and government college for girls and many more educational institutes like Adil Academy and Farghana Educational Foundation School. The population of Kashmir colony is approx  which is mixture of Mughals, Maliks and many other casts like Butt, Jarral, Janjua, Dammal, Gujjar and Kiyani. Many political figures are based in Kashmir colony including Senior politician & businessman Mushtaq Noori ,Malik Azad ,Ilyas Adil, Manzoor Hussain Janjua ,Shabbir Hussain Mughal,Kramat ullah Malik, Khawaja Farooq, Malik Binyameen, khawaja Shabbir, Nisar Ahmed Baig and many others.

Geography of Punjab, Pakistan